Jordils is a Lausanne Métro station on M2 line. It was opened on 27 October 2008 as part of the inaugural section of the line, from Croisettes to Ouchy–Olympique. The station is located between Délices and Ouchy–Olympique.

In 1877, a funicular between Lausanne and Ouchy was opened, which had Jordils station. In 1959 the funicular was rebuilt as a rack railway. In 2003, the railway was demolished to give way for construction of M2 line. In 2008 the station was reopened at the same location.

References

Lausanne Metro stations
Railway stations in Switzerland opened in 2008